Abdul Waseque was a Member of the 3rd National Assembly of Pakistan as a representative of East Pakistan.

Early life
Waseque was born in Dhaka in 1909.

Career
Waseque was a Member of the 3rd National Assembly of Pakistan representing Dacca-I.

Death
Waseque died on 21 November 1967.

References

Pakistani MNAs 1962–1965
1909 births
1967 deaths